sec-Butyllithium is an organometallic compound with the formula CH3CHLiCH2CH3, abbreviated sec-BuLi or s-BuLi. This chiral organolithium reagent is used as a source of sec-butyl carbanion in organic synthesis.

Synthesis
sec-BuLi can be prepared by the reaction of sec-butyl halides with lithium metal:

Properties

Physical properties 
sec-Butyllithium is a colorless viscous liquid. Using mass spectrometry, it was determined that the pure compound has a tetrameric structure. It also exists as tetramers when dissolved in organic solvents such as benzene, cyclohexane or cyclopentane. The cyclopentane solution has been detected with 6Li-NMR spectroscopy to have a hexameric structure at temperatures below −41 °C. In electron-donating solvents such as tetrahydrofuran, there exists an equilibrium between monomeric and dimeric forms.

Chemical properties 
The carbon-lithium bond is highly polar, rendering the carbon basic, as in other organolithium reagents.  Sec-butyllithium is more basic than the primary organolithium reagent, n-butyllithium.  It is also more sterically hindered. sec-BuLi is employed for deprotonations of particularly weak carbon acids where the more conventional reagent n-BuLi is unsatisfactory.  It is, however, so basic that its use requires greater care than for  n-BuLi.  For example diethyl ether is attacked by sec-BuLi at room temperature in minutes, whereas ether solutions of  n-BuLi are stable. 

The compound decomposes slowly at room temperature and more rapidly at higher temperatures, giving lithium hydride and a mixture of butenes.

Applications
Many transformations involving sec-butyllithium are similar to those involving other organolithium reagents.  

In combination with sparteine as a chiral auxiliary, sec-butyllithium is useful in enantioselective deprototonations.  It is also effective for lithiation of arenes.

References

Organolithium compounds